Shawn Rhoads (born January 18, 1977) is an American politician who served in the Missouri House of Representatives from the 154th district from 2013 to 2018.

References

1977 births
Living people
People from West Plains, Missouri
Republican Party members of the Missouri House of Representatives